Gabrovo Municipality is a municipality (obshtina) in Gabrovo Province, North-central Bulgaria, located on the northern slopes of the central Stara planina mountain to the area of the so-called Fore-Balkan. It is named after its administrative centre - the city of Gabrovo which is also the capital of the province.

Aside from the rich cultural landmarks of the main city, the area is best known with the beautifully preserved architectural reserve of Bozhentsi village and the north approach to Shipka Pass which was a noted place of the Bulgarian history and one of the main transport connections between the north and south parts of Bulgaria and the Balkan peninsula.

Settlements 

(towns are shown in bold):
Population (December 2009)

 Gabrovo - Габрово - 60,281
 Angelov - Ангелов - 46
 Armenite - Армените - 125
 Baevtsi - Баевци - 4
 Balanite - Баланите - 16
 Balinovtsi - Балиновци - 14
 Bankovtsi - Банковци - 30
 Bekriite - Бекриите - 5
 Belomazhite - Беломъжите - 17
 Bobevtsi - Бобевци - 2
 Bogdanchovtsi - Богданчовци - 35
 Bozhentsi - Боженци - 38
 Boynovtsi - Бойновци - 16
 Boycheta - Бойчета - 2
 Boltata - Болтата - 28
 Boriki - Борики - 160
 Borskoto - Борското - 15
 Branetsite - Брънеците - 60
 Byalkovo - Бялково - 11
 Chavei - Чавеи - 27
 Charkovo - Чарково - 171
 Chervena lokva - Червена локва - 6
 Chernevtsi - Черневци - 8
 Chitakovtsi - Читаковци - 15
 Chukilite - Чукилите - 19
 Debel dyal - Дебел дял - 109
 Dzhumriite - Джумриите - 9
 Divetsi - Дивеци - 11
 Donino - Донино - 166
 Draganovtsi - Драгановци - 412
 Draganchetata - Драганчетата - 32
 Dragievtsi - Драгиевци - 47
 Dragomani - Драгомани - 7
 Dumnitsi - Думници - 49
 Ezeroto - Езерото - 22
 Fargovtsi - Фърговци - 25
 Gaykini - Гайкини - 2
 Gaytanite - Гайтаните - 32
 Garvan - Гарван - 53
 Genovtsi - Геновци - 6
 Genchovtsi - Генчовци - 14
 Gergini - Гергини - 138
 Gledatsi - Гледаци - 79
 Gornova mogila - Горнова могила - 4
 Grablevtsi - Гръблевци - 19
 Gabene - Гъбене - 288
 Haracherite - Харачерите - 29
 Ivanili - Иванили - 17
 Ivankovtsi - Иванковци - 29
 Iglikika - Игликика - 10
 Iztochnik - Източник - 21
 Kameshitsa - Камешица - 69
 Karali - Карали - 9
 Kievtsi - Киевци - 118
 Kmetovtsi - Кметовци - 33
 Kmetcheta - Кметчета - 6
 Kozi rog - Кози рог - 71
 Kolishovtsi - Колишовци - 0
 Kopcheliite - Копчелиите - 106
 Kostadinite - Костадините - 7
 Kostenkovtsi - Костенковци - 35
 Lesicharka - Лесичарка - 85
 Loza - Лоза - 65
 Malini - Малини - 30
 Malusha - Малуша - 5
 Mezhdeni - Междени - 45
 Mechkovitsa - Мечковица - 38
 Milkovtsi - Милковци - 48
 Mihaylovtsi - Михайловци - 40
 Michkovtsi - Мичковци - 58
 Mrahori - Мрахори - 33
 Muzga - Музга - 142
 Nikolchovtsi - Николчовци - 39
 Novakovtsi - Новаковци - 128
 Ovoshtartsi - Овощарци - 12
 Orlovtsi - Орловци - 53
 Parchovtsi - Парчовци - 15
 Peyovtsi - Пейовци - 8
 Penkovtsi - Пенковци - 16
 Petrovtsi - Петровци - 8
 Petsovtsi - Пецовци - 34
 Popari - Попари - 2
 Popovtsi - Поповци - 525
 Potok - Поток - 12
 Prahali - Прахали - 51
 Prodanovtsi - Продановци - 0
 Partevtsi - Пъртевци - 7
 Raynovtsi - Райновци - 128
 Rahovtsi - Раховци - 47
 Rachevtsi - Рачевци - 17
 Redeshkovtsi - Редешковци - 0
 Ruychovtsi - Руйчовци - 2
 Ryazkovtsi - Рязковци - 45
 Svinarski dol - Свинарски дол - 13
 Sedyankovtsi - Седянковци - 43
 Seykovtsi - Сейковци - 6
 Semerdzhiite - Семерджиите - 2
 Sharani - Шарани - 15
 Shipchenite - Шипчените - 16
 Smilovtsi - Смиловци - 42
 Solari - Солари - 9
 Spantsi - Спанци - 15
 Spasovtsi - Спасовци - 11
 Starilkovtsi - Старилковци - 7
 Stefanovo - Стефаново - 9
 Stoevtsi - Стоевци - 90
 Stoykovtsi - Стойковци - 19
 Stoychovtsi - Стойчовци - 24
 Stomanetsite - Стоманеците - 28
 Sabotkovtsi - Съботковци - 49
 Todorovtsi - Тодоровци - 8
 Todorcheta - Тодорчета - 17
 Torbalazhite - Торбалъжите - 20
 Trapeskovtsi - Трапесковци - 15
 Tranito - Трънито - 176
 Tsvyatkovtsi - Цвятковци - 17
 Uzunite - Узуните - 18
 Yavorets - Яворец - 631
 Yankovtsi - Янковци - 120
 Yasenite - Ясените - 23

Demography 
The following table shows the change of the population during the last four decades.

Religion 
According to the latest Bulgarian census of 2011, the religious composition, among those who answered the optional question on religious identification, was the following:

See also
Provinces of Bulgaria
Municipalities of Bulgaria
List of cities and towns in Bulgaria

References

External links
 Official website 

Municipalities in Gabrovo Province